Charles Bishop Baillie (born February 14, 1935) is a former Canadian football player who played for the Calgary Stampeders and Montreal Alouettes. His twin brother, Ray Baillie, also played in the CFL.

References

1935 births
Anglophone Quebec people
Living people
Players of Canadian football from Quebec
Canadian football running backs
McGill Redbirds football coaches
Montreal Alouettes players
Calgary Stampeders players
Canadian football people from Montreal
Canadian twins
Twin sportspeople